Cenoceras is an extinct genus within the cephalopod mollusc family Nautilidae, which in turn makes up part of the superfamily Nautilaceae. This genus has been described by Hyatt in 1884. The type species is Cenoceras intermedium (Sowerby).

Species
Cenoceras boreale †  Dagys and Sobolev 1988
Cenoceras trechmanni †  Kummel 1953

Description
Shells of these nektonic carnivores are variable in form, depending on species; ranges from evolute to involute, compressed lenticular to globose with rounded to flattened venter and flanks. The suture generally has shallow ventral and lateral lobes. The location of the siphuncle is variable, but never at an extreme ventral or dorsal position (Kümmel 1964, K449).

Fossil range
Cenoceras has a fossil range from the Upper Triassic, Carnian age to the Middle Jurassic, Callovian age (from 235.0 to 163.5 Ma).

References 

 Kümmel, B. 1964, Nauiloidea-Nautilida, in The Treatise on Invertebrate Paleontology, Part K, Nautiloidea; Geological Society of America and University of Kansas Press.
 Cyril Walker & David Ward (1993) - Fossielen: Sesam Natuur Handboeken, Bosch & Keuning, Baarn.

External links
 Europeana

Prehistoric nautiloid genera
Late Triassic first appearances
Middle Jurassic extinctions
Prehistoric cephalopods of Europe